A Welcome Intruder is a 1913 silent film short directed by D. W. Griffith and produced by the Biograph Company.

Cast
Charles Hill Mailes - The Father
Kate Toncray - The Neighbor
Charles West - The Workman
W. Chrystie Miller - The Shopkeeper 
Joseph McDermott - The Policeman
Frank Opperman - The Hurdy-Gurdy Man
Claire McDowell - A Widow
Adolph Lestina (it) - The Construction Boss
William A. Carroll - The Wagon Driver
John T. Dillon - uncredited

See also
D. W. Griffith filmography

References

External links
A Welcome Intruder at IMDb.com
poster source(archived)

1913 films
American silent short films
1913 short films
American black-and-white films
Films directed by D. W. Griffith
Biograph Company films
1910s American films